Oastler is a surname. Notable people with the surname include:

Richard Oastler (1789–1861), English labour reformer and abolitionist
Malcolm Oastler (born 1959), British Formula One designer and director